Sattler (German (also Sättler): occupational name for a saddler) may refer to:
People
 Barbara Sattler-Kovacevic, Austrian retired slalom canoeist 
 Barbara Sattler (philosopher), British philosopher
 Daryl Sattler (born 1980), American soccer player
 Ellie Sattler, fictional character in Jurassic Park
 Georg Sattler (1917–1944), German Luftwaffe pilot
 Helen Roney Sattler (1921–1992), American children's author
 Henri Sattler (born 1971), founder and vocalist/guitarist of God Dethroned
 Hubert Sattler (1844–1928), Austrian–German ophthalmologist
 Hubert Sattler (painter) (1817–1904), Austrian landscape painter
 Jerome Sattler (born 1931), American psychologist
 Johann Michael Sattler (1786–1847), Austrian portrait and landscape painter
 John Sattler (born 1942), Australian rugby league footballer 
 John F. Sattler (born 1949), United States Marine Corps lieutenant general
 Joseph Sattler (1867–1931), German Art Nouveau illustrator
 Klaus Siegfried Oskar Sattler (born 1932) British lepidopterist
 Mary Sattler (born 1973), American Democratic politician
 Michael Sattler (1495–1527), German Anabaptist monk and martyr
 Norbert Sattler (born 1951), Austrian slalom canoeist
 Peggy Sattler, Canadian New Democratic Party politician
 Rolf Sattler (born 1936), Canadian botanist and philosopher
 Scott Sattler (born 1971), Australian rugby league footballer
 Ulrike Sattler, German computer scientist
 Warren Sattler (born 1934), American cartoonist and illustrator

Other
 99201 Sattler, an asteroid named after Birgit I. Sattler
 Sattler Airfield, an abandoned airfield in Northern Territory, Australia
 Sattler's, a department store chain headquartered in Buffalo, New York
 Sattler's layer, a layer of blood vessels in the eye

See also 
 

German-language surnames
Occupational surnames